Vikrampuri is a colony on the suburbs located in Secunderabad on the Rajiv Gandhi Rahadir on the Karimnagar Highway, very close to Secunderabad Club. It is right next to Karkhana and most of the times considered as part of Trimulgherry. It is home to Neetu Kundra Center for Specific Learning Disorders (dyslexia, dysgraphia, and dyscalculia) and AskNeetu Psychological Counselling Center, an assessment center and a suicidal prevention and counselling center. Care4Autism Center extension, Positive Homeopathy is located on the main road. KFC, Big Noodles, NEST Hospital and Rainbow Children's Hospital are also located in Vikrampuri.

Commercial area
HDFC BANK, SBH and SBI are located on the main road. Ghanshyam Super Market and Ratnadeep are two large super stores located in Vikrampuri.
Vikrampuri also has an army cantonment.

Neighbourhoods in Hyderabad, India